Alexey Vladimirovich Vorobyov (19 January 1988) is a Russian singer and actor who performs both in Russian and English. For international purposes Vorobyov is also credited as Alex Sparrow, a translation of his Russian name. He is best known for appearing on the Russian version of The X Factor at the age of 17 in 2005. In 2006 Vorobyov was contracted by Universal Music Russia, and in December 2007 was appointed as a goodwill ambassador for Y-PEER, a youth-based initiative of the United Nations Population Fund. Vorobyov represented the Russian Federation in the Eurovision Song Contest 2011 in Germany.

Early life

Alex was born on 19 January 1988 in Tula (Russian: Тула), RSFSR, Soviet Union. His father is Head of Security, and his mother is a housewife. Alex played football as a child and played for the local youth team in Tula. At first, he wanted to pursue a career in sports but later chose to pursue music as his profession.

Music career
Alex studied the accordion at the College of Music. While there, he participated in many competitions. When Alex graduated he decided to return to the musical school, however this time he opted to study in the vocal department. For a short period of time, he was the lead singer of the Tula folklore ensemble "Delight."

In 2005, Alex won the gold medal for his solo performance at the Delphic Games IV. In the same year Alex went to Moscow where he was ranked No. 3 in a TV competition. He later moved to Moscow and entered more competitions. In 2006, he signed a contract for Universal Music Russia. In July of that year Alex was one of the performers at the "Big Eight" which was held in St Petersburg. He was one of the executors of "Youth Eight" and was also given the opportunity to sing during the closing ceremony.
In 2007, Alex won an MTV award for upcoming artists.

In 2008 and 2009 he competed in the Russian national selections for the Eurovision Song Contest with the songs New Russian Kalinka and Angelom Biht but lost to Dima Bilan and Anastasia Prikhodko respectively. On 5 March 2011, he was eventually selected to represent Russian Federation in the Eurovision Song Contest 2011, with the song "Get You," written by highly successful Moroccan producer Nadir Khayat (RedOne).

He returned in 2009 but was forced to withdraw his entry due to employment schedule conflict.
Alex was finally chosen to represent Russia in the Eurovision Song Contest 2011 and was internally selected. He finished 16th overall in the contest. After recovering from a serious car accident he suffered in early 2013, Vorobyov is back with music he has written, composed and arranged himself. Called Friend project, it is a collaboration with his friend, Russian actor Sergei Romanovich. The latter had already appeared in Laskoviy Mai, a film about the career of the famous Soviet band of the same name.

Acting career
His acting career took off in 2006 when he starred in "Alice's Dream." Alex later enrolled in acting school. Spring 2008 saw Alex graduate from the theater school. He later became a student of the Moscow Art Theater School. Once his employment in acting was well established, Alex left the school. 
In 2010, Alex took part in a reality series called "Cruel Intentions," he made it to the finals finishing in second place. Later that year, he enlisted as a candidate on the TV show "Ice and Fire" in which he paired up with the famous ice-skater Tatiana Navka (Russian: Татьяна Навка). Despite an arm injury Alex continued his participation in the show.

On 26 September 2019, it was announced that Alex Sparrow was cast as Yuri "Bobby" Telatovich in the Netflix comedy series, Space Force.

Personal life

In 2011 Alex Sparrow dated Russian pop star Victoria Dayneko.

On 22 January 2013 Alex Sparrow was seriously injured in a car crash in Los Angeles, United States, after his Porsche hit another car. Alex was taken to a hospital with a brain trauma and several other injuries, which ended up in half of his face going numb, and put him in intensive care. He recovered and slowly returned to recording and acting.

Discography

Singles
 2006 — Leto (Summer)
 2007 — Alisa
 2007 — Devchonka (Girl)
 2007 — Seychas ili Nikogda (Now or never)
 2007 — Russkie Zabili (Russian's forgot)
 2008 — Desire
 2008 — New Russian Kalinka
 2008 — Toska
 2008 — Ti i Ya (You and I)
 2008 — Zabud Menya (Forget me)
 2009 — Accordeon
 2009 — Reality
 2010 — Shout It Out
 2011 — Get You
 2015 — Sumasshedshaya (She's crazy but she's mine)
 2016 — Samaja Krasiwaja (The beauty)

Filmography
Backwater District  (2009) Main Protagonist
The Phobos (2010) 
 The Three Musketeers (2013) 
 Sin City: A Dame to Kill For (2014) 
The Vatican Tapes (2015) 
Unreal (2017) Special Guest/Recurring Role
Space Force (2020) Recurring Role
NCIS (2022) Special Guest

References

External links

  
 

1988 births
Living people
People from Tula, Russia
21st-century Russian singers
Russian male actors
Eurovision Song Contest entrants of 2011
Eurovision Song Contest entrants for Russia
21st-century Russian male singers
Winners of the Golden Gramophone Award